The Italian Co-Belligerent Navy (Marina Cobelligerante Italiana), or Navy of the South (Marina del Sud) or Royal Navy (Regia Marina), was the navy of the Italian royalist forces fighting on the side of the Allies in southern Italy after the Allied armistice with Italy in September 1943.  The Italian seamen fighting for this navy no longer fought for Italian dictator Benito Mussolini.  Their allegiance was to King Victor Emmanuel and Marshal of Italy (Maresciallo d'Italia) Pietro Badoglio, the men who ousted Mussolini. This culminated in the fall of fascism in the south of Italy.

The Italian Navy played an important role once the armistice was signed. Nine cruisers, 33 destroyers, 39 submarines, 12 motor torpedo boats, 20 escorts, three mine-layers, and the seaplane tender Giusseppe Miraglia joined the Italian Co-Belligerent Navy. The two modern s were detained by the Allies in Egyptian waters, while the three older battleships were allowed to serve as training ships. There were additionally four squadrons of seaplanes from the Italian Royal Air Force (Regia Aeronautica).

Present within the Co-Belligerent Navy were the groups "Mariassalto", carrying on the legacy of the Decima Flottiglia MAS  frogmen group on the allied side, and the "San Marco" brigade, who were the first allied forces to enter the city of Venice.

See also
 Military history of Italy during World War II
 Co-belligerence
 Regia Marina
 Italian Co-Belligerent Army
 Italian Co-Belligerent Air Force
 Marina Nazionale Repubblicana

Military units and formations of Italy in World War II
Italian Navy
Disbanded navies
1943 establishments in Italy
Military units and formations established in 1943